Arameans in Israel are a Christian minority residing in Israel. They claim to descend from the Arameans, an ancient Semitic-speaking people in the Middle East in the 1st millennium BC.

Some Syriac Christians in the Middle East espouse an Aramean ethnic identity, and a minority in Syria still speak a Western Aramaic language, although the Eastern Aramaic languages are more widely spoken. Until 2014, self-identified Arameans in Israel were registered as ethnic Arabs or without an ethnic identity. Since September 2014, Aramean has become a valid identity on the Israeli population census, making Israel the first country in the world to officially recognize Arameans as a modern community. Christian families or clans who can speak Aramaic and/or have an Aramaic family tradition are eligible to register on the census as ethnic Arameans in Israel.

According to a 2022 article in Middle Eastern Studies, no less than 2,500 Israeli's are known to have registered as Arameans at the Israeli Ministry of Interior, whereas another 2,000 are known to have applied for changing their national denomination from Arab to Aramean. These 4,500 people in total constitute  of Israel's Christian population.

History

Abraham, the father of Western monotheism, was believed to be of Aramean ancestry. The Jews and Christians regard him as the Patriarch of the Jewish people.  Abraham's son Isaac and grandson Jacob, also each took wives of Aramean descent: (respectively, Rebecca, and Leah and Rachel), who originated from the Aramean region of Paddan-Aram. The Aramean presence in Israel goes back to 1100 BCE, when much of Israel came under Aramean rule for eight years according to the Biblical Book of Judges, until Othniel defeated the forces led by Chushan-Rishathaim, the King of Aram-Naharaim.

After the Arameans converted to Syriac Christianity they became involved in the expansion of Christianity throughout the Middle-East, which resulted in various Syriac monasteries and churches being built especially in Jerusalem and Bethlehem of whom the Monastery of Saint Mark, Jerusalem among the oldest. According to a 6th-century inscription Inscription at the Monastery of St Mark's in Jerusalem found during a restoration in 1940, the church is on the ancient site of the house of Mary, mother of St. Mark the Evangelist (Acts 12:12) and the place of the Last Supper of Christ with His disciples. Some Christians believe that the Last Supper was held at the nearby Cenacle on Mount Zion.

Around 1831 large numbers of Syriac Christians started to emigrate to Israel as pilgrims and settled there, mostly originating from the Tur Abdin region. During the Seyfo: the genocide on Syriac Christians in the Ottoman Empire a large mass emigration occurred from Tur-Abdin. They mainly settled in Jerusalem, Bethlehem and in smaller numbers in Jericho and Nazareth. In Bethlehem they also constructed the Virgin Mary church between 1922 and 1928 in the Syriac Quarter.

After the advent of Zionism and Israel's occupation of Jerusalem in 1967, hundreds of Syriac Christians were expelled and their homes and shops given over to Jewish settlers. Thousands of Arameans fled to Jordan or the West in the ensuing chaos. Estimates that 65% of the Syriac Christian population left for good. Today, the Syriac Quarter area is part of the Armenian and Jewish Quarter - which expanded to several times its original size through the dispossession of 6,000 non-Jewish residents.

Demographics
The first person to receive the "Aramean" ethnic status in Israel was 2 year old Yaakov Halul in Jish on October 20, 2014. In July 2016, an article in the Ha'aretz estimated the number of Israeli Christians eligible to register as Arameans in Israel to be 13,000. In October 2019, the Israeli Christian Aramaic Organization estimated the number of Israeli citizens, who are eligible to obtain Aramean affiliation at 15,000.

According to a 2022 article in Middle Eastern Studies, no less than 2,500 Israelis are known to have registered as Arameans at the Israeli Ministry of Interior, whereas another 2,000 are known to have applied for changing their national denomination from Arab to Aramean. These 4,500 people in total constitute  of Israel's Christian population.

Recognition in Israel

Legal recognition
Under the Ministry of the Interior's guidance, people born into Christian families or clans who have either Aramaic or Maronite cultural heritage within their family are eligible to register as Arameans. About 200 Christian families were thought to be eligible prior to this decision. According to an August 9, 2013 Israel Hayom article, at that time an estimated 10,500 persons were eligible to receive Aramean ethnic status according to the new regulation, including 10,000 Maronites (which included 2,000 former SLA members) and 500 Syriac Catholics.

The first person to receive the "Aramean" ethnic status in Israel was 2 year old Yaakov Halul in Jish on October 20, 2014.

In 2019, an Israeli court ruled that Aramean minorities could choose a Jewish or Arab education, rather than requiring children with Aramean identity to be automatically enrolled in Arabic-language schools.

Controversy
The recognition of the Aramean ethnicity caused mixed reactions among Israeli minorities, the Christian community, and among the general Arab Israeli population. Representatives of the Greek Orthodox Patriarchate of Jerusalem denounced the move.

Mordechai Kedar advocates the recognition of the Aramean identity and calls on the government of Israel to promote the awareness regarding this issue on the basis of the international principle of ethnic self-determination as espoused by Wilson's 14 points. One of the supporters of the recognition of the Aramean identity is Gabriel Naddaf, who is a priest to the Greek Orthodox Christians in Israel. He advocated on behalf of his Aramean followers and thanked the Interior Ministry's decision as a "historic move".

See also

Arameans
Christianity in Israel

References

External links
Arameans in the Middle East and Israel: Historical Background, Modern National Identity, and Government Policy

Sources

 
 
 
 
 
 

 
Ethnic groups in Israel
Syriac Christians
Ethnic groups in the Middle East